Marty in the Morning is RTÉ lyric fm's breakfast show, presented by Marty Whelan. Before, it was RTÉ 2fm's breakfast show, presented also by Marty Whelan from 26 September 2005 until it was axed when Colm & Jim-Jim joined from FM104. The duo held  the 2fm breakfast slot with The Colm & Jim-Jim Breakfast Show until the death of Gerry Ryan prompted a further change in the schedules in 2010. Marty in the Morning was an attempt by 2fm to find an able successor to Ryan Tubridy who had left The Full Irish and defected to RTÉ Radio 1 in 2005. However, in May 2006, it emerged that the show was receiving fewer listeners than its rival The Ian Dempsey Breakfast Show on Today FM. Prior to this, Whelan's predecessors Rick O'Shea and Ruth Scott had Tubridy's replacement The Rick & Ruth Breakfast Show axed after it emerged the flagship The Gerry Ryan Show was losing 40,000 listeners to Today FM's The Ray D'Arcy Show. O'Shea and Scott were blamed for this and quickly disappeared off the morning airwaves.

References

Irish breakfast radio shows
RTÉ 2fm programmes